The First of a Million Kisses is the debut album by Fairground Attraction, released in 1988. The album features the number-one single "Perfect".

Composition
The album is a characteristic blend of folk, jazz, country, and Cajun elements (all but one of its songs being written by band member Mark E. Nevin). Released on 16 May 1988, it followed the success of the band's first single, "Perfect," by entering the UK Albums Chart at number seven, and peaking at number two. It was the only album released by the band before their break-up in 1990.

Three other singles were released from the album: "Find My Love" (which reached number seven in the UK Singles Chart), "A Smile in a Whisper" (UK #75), and "Clare" (UK #49).

The First of a Million Kisses won the award for British Album of the Year at the 1989 Brit Awards, and was certified double platinum in the UK.

Cover
The photo on the album cover is from Magnum photographer Elliot Erwitt and was taken in 1955.

Track listing
All tracks written by Mark E. Nevin, except track 11 by Eddi Reader

"A Smile in a Whisper"
"Perfect"
"Moon on the Rain"
"Find My Love"
"Fairground Attraction"
"The Wind Knows My Name"
"Clare"
"Comedy Waltz"
"The Moon Is Mine"
"Station Street"
"Whispers"
"Allelujah"

The following two tracks are available only on CD issues of the album:

13.  "Falling Backwards"
14.  "Mythology"
The following tracks have been added to the new expanded 2CD edition and come from the Ay Fond Kiss release, the Live in Japan release or are (*) previously unreleased:

15. "Trying Times" 

16. "Winter Rose" 

17. "Ay Fond Kiss" 

18. "You Send Me" 

19. "Watching The Party" 

20. "Jock O’ Hazeldean" 

21. "The Game Of Love"

Disc Two:

1. "Mystery Train" 

2. "Do You Want To Know A Secret?" 

3. "The Waltz Continues" (Live In Japan) 

4. "Don’t Be A Stranger" (Live In Japan) 

5. "Dangerous" (Live In Japan) 

6. "I Know Why The Willow Weeps" (Live In Japan) 

7. "Home To Heartache" (Live In Japan) 

8. "Fear Is The Enemy Of Love" (Live In Japan) 

9. "Broken By A Breeze" (Live In Japan) 

10. "Goodbye To Songtown" (Live In Japan) 

11. "I May Never Be Queen"* 

12. "Prayer For St Valentine"* 

13. "Swing Trumpet" (Demo)* 

14. "Red Ribbon" (Demo)* 

15. "Find My Love" (Demo)* 

16. "Mythology" (Demo)* 

17. "Station Street" (Demo)* 

18. "The Moon Is Mine" (Demo)* 

19. "Walking After Midnight" (Version)*

Personnel

Musicians
Eddi Reader – lead vocals
Mark E. Nevin – guitars
Simon Edwards – guitarrón
Ray Dodds – drums & percussion

Guests
Kim Burton – accordion, tiny harp, piano
Roger Beaujolais – vibes, glockenspiel
Anthony Thistlethwaite – mandolin
Steve Forster – mandolin
Ian Shaw – backing vocals
Will Hasty – clarinet

Chart positions

References 

1988 debut albums
RCA Records albums
Brit Award for British Album of the Year
Fairground Attraction albums